Linum pubescens, the hairy pink flax, is an herbaceous flowering plant in the genus Linum native to the east Mediterranean region.
The plant is annual and blooms in the spring.

References

pubescens
Flora of Lebanon
Flora of Palestine (region)
Flora of Israel
Taxa named by Joseph Banks
Taxa named by Daniel Solander